Canadian Forces Station Alert, often shortened to CFS Alert, is a signals intelligence intercept facility of the Canadian Armed Forces at Alert, in the Qikiqtaaluk Region of Nunavut, Canada.

Located on the northeastern tip of Ellesmere Island, Alert is the northernmost continuously inhabited place in the world. The entire population of Baffin, Unorganized, part of the Baffin Region, the Statistics Canada name for Qikiqtaaluk, resides here. As of the 2016 Canadian census the population was 62, an increase of 1,140 per cent over the 2011 census.

History

Alert Wireless Station
Alert, then in Canada's Northwest Territories, was first settled April 9, 1950, when the first staff for the Joint Arctic Weather Station (JAWS) arrived and began construction. Since the beginning of the JAWS project, the Canadian military had been interested in the establishment at Alert for several reasons: the JAWS facility extended Canadian sovereignty over a large uninhabited area which Canada claimed as its sovereign territory, and furthermore, its proximity to the Soviet Union made it of strategic importance. Alert is closer to Moscow (c. ) than it is to the capital Ottawa (c. ). Thus, the possibility of using the site for intercepting radio signals was deemed to warrant a military presence.

In 1956, the Royal Canadian Air Force (RCAF), which was expanding its presence throughout the high Arctic with the construction of the Distant Early Warning Line radar network, established a building uphill from the Department of Transport's JAWS station to house "High Arctic Long Range Communications Research", or signals intelligence operations.

In 1957, Alert Wireless Station was conceived as an intercept facility to be jointly staffed by personnel from the Royal Canadian Navy (RCN) and the RCAF. Five additional buildings were constructed: a mess, three barracks, and a power house and vehicle maintenance building, in addition to the existing operations building, built in 1956. The operations building housed the radio intercept and cryptographic equipment. On 1 September 1958 control of the station was transferred from the RCAF to the Canadian Army and it officially began operations.

Canadian Forces Station Alert
The following decade saw a dramatic expansion of the station with a correspondingly greater number of personnel stationed there. The 1 February 1968 unification of the RCN, RCAF, and army to form the Canadian Armed Forces saw Alert Wireless Station change its name to Canadian Forces Station Alert (CFS Alert). Its personnel were no longer drawn from only the air force or navy, but primarily from the Canadian Forces Communications Command.

At its peak, CFS Alert had upwards of 215 personnel posted at any one time. The station became a key asset in the global ECHELON network of the US-UK-CAN-AUS-NZ intelligence sharing alliance, with Alert being privy to many secret Soviet communications regarding land-based and sea-based ICBM test launches and many operational military deployments.

The first military women to serve in Alert arrived in 1980 as part of the Canadian Forces' Women In Non-Traditional Roles study. After its completion in 1983, women were fully authorized to serve in all roles. The first female commanding officer was Major Cathy Cowan, who took command in January 1996.  The first female Station Warrant Officer (SWO), Master Warrant Officer Renee Hansen, was appointed in December 2017.

Budget cuts to the Department of National Defence (DND) and Canadian Forces in 1994, and modernization of communications equipment, saw CFS Alert downsized to approximately 74 personnel by 1997–1998 when most radio-intercept operations were remotely controlled by personnel at CFS Leitrim. Remaining personnel are responsible for airfield operations, construction/engineering, food service, and logistical/administrative support. Only six persons are now responsible for actual operations, and control of the facility was passed to DND's Information Management Group following the disbanding of CF Communications Command with force restructuring and cutbacks in the mid-1990s. Several of these personnel are likely also attached to DND's Communications Security Establishment.

With Canada's commitment to the global war on terrorism following the September 11, 2001 terrorist attacks in New York City and Washington, D.C., CFS Alert has received renewed and increased funding to expand its SIGINT capabilities. On 1 April 2009, the RCAF officially took responsibility for CFS Alert from Canadian Forces Information Operations Group (CFIOG).

Civilian contractor
 the Canadian Broadcasting Corporation reported that station heating costs had risen, leading the military to cut back on support trade positions by using private contractors. By 2008, maintenance operations on station (including food and housekeeping services, vehicle maintenance, power plant operation, and heating, electrical, and plumbing) had been transferred to a civilian contractor.  The contract was initially awarded to Canadian Base Operators (CBO), a subsidiary of Black & McDonald.  In 2012, the contract was won by Nasittuq, a subsidiary of ATCO.

Facilities and infrastructure
 Alert Airport
 Cold storage building
 Construction engineering building
 Fire station
 Headquarters and Personnel Services (HAPS) building: Churchill Hall
 Living quarters: Chimo Hall, Ladner Hall, and Whitehorse Hall
 Gym
 Operations building: Polaris Hall
 Power plants: primary and backup
 Supply building
 Vehicle maintenance building
 Water treatment plant

Main building
The main building consists of five halls; Churchill Hall contains the administrative and main amenities on the station, such as a gathering area called the "beach", a dining room called Igloo Gardens, library, barber shop, radio station, post office, and a store. Chimo, Ladner, and Whitehorse halls are the three barrack blocks, which each barrack block containing three sections. Polaris Hall contains the operations branch. All halls and barrack blocks are connected by a linkway. Because of the cold climate, the doors leading in and out of the main building are the same as those for walk-in refrigerators.

See also

 Amundsen–Scott South Pole Station
 Drifting ice station (North Pole station)
 Station Nord, Greenland
 CFS Frobisher Bay

References

External links

CFS Alert (Canadian Forces)
CFS Alert, J. Proc history page
The Frozen Chosen - DND video on life in CFS Alert, YouTube

Ellesmere Island
Populated places in the Qikiqtaaluk Region
Populated places in Arctic Canada
Canadian Forces bases in Nunavut
Canadian Forces Supplementary Radio System
Signals intelligence